Adomas Danusevičius (born 1984) is a Lithuanian artist. He studied painting at Vilnius Academy of Arts; in 2017 he was a doctoral student there. He made his debut in the Lithuanian contemporary art scene during his years of study.

Awards 
 2012 Public Prize at international contest 'Young painters prize'12', Vilnius, Lithuania
 2009 'Award of Dalia Gruodiene', Vilnius, Lithuania

Solo shows 
 2008 'Carmine', paintings exhibition by Adomas Danusevicius and Alina Melnikova, gallery 'Tulips&Roses', Vilnius, Lithuania
 2012 'Paintings by Adomas Danusevicius', gallery 'Vartai', Vilnius, Lithuania
 2012 'Carmine', gallery 'Larm', Copenhagen, Denmark
 2014 'Camouflage Masculinity', Culture and Communication center, Klaipeda, Lithuania
 2014 'Camouflage Masculinity', VDU gallery 101, Kaunas, Lithuania
 2014 'Camouflage Masculinity', Oslo house gallery, Vilnius, Lithuania
 2015 The Camp &The Beautiful, Atelier am Eck, Düsseldorf, Germany
 2017 Penis Mushroom Series, The Rooster Gallery, Vilnius, Lithuania
 2017 ‘Camouflage Masculinity and Campish Dazzle’, Titanic exhibition hall, Vilnius, Lithuania

References 

Lithuanian painters
Vilnius Academy of Arts alumni
1984 births
Living people